Austin H. Gunsel (April 2, 1909 - June 17, 1974) was the National Football League's interim commissioner from 1959 to 1960, following the death of Bert Bell on October 11, 1959.

Education 
Gunsel was born in Irvington, New Jersey and is a graduate of the Wharton School of the University of Pennsylvania.

Career 
Gunsel joined the Federal Bureau of Investigation in 1939. He served as both J. Edgar Hoover's administrative assistant and as a special agent for the Bureau, and during his crime-fighting career, served in the New York City, Detroit and Chicago field offices.

In 1952, Gunsel was hired by the NFL to head the league's investigative department, a move made in response to commissioner Bert Bell's fear of a scandal damaging the league's image. Gunsel became league treasurer in 1956, holding the post until his retirement ten years later. He served as acting president of the NFL after Bell's death in October 1959.

In January 1960 at a meeting of NFL owners, he was the early frontrunner to get the commissioner's job, but Los Angeles Rams general manager Pete Rozelle, 17 years Gunsel's junior, was ultimately elected to the post on January 26 after 23 ballots. Gunsel stayed on as NFL treasurer until his retirement on July 1, 1966.

Personal life 
At the age of 65, Gunsel died at Lankenau Hospital in Wynnewood, Pennsylvania.

References

1909 births
1974 deaths
Federal Bureau of Investigation agents
National Football League commissioners
Wharton School of the University of Pennsylvania alumni
People from Irvington, New Jersey